Jack Reacher: Never Go Back is a 2016 American action-thriller film directed by Edward Zwick, written by Zwick, Richard Wenk, and Marshall Herskovitz, and based on the 2013 novel Never Go Back by Lee Child. A sequel to the 2012 film Jack Reacher, the film stars Tom Cruise and Cobie Smulders, with the supporting cast featuring Patrick Heusinger, Aldis Hodge, Danika Yarosh, Holt McCallany, and Robert Knepper. The plot follows Reacher going on the run with an Army major who has been framed for espionage, as the two reveal a dark conspiracy.

Principal photography began on October 20, 2015, in New Orleans, and the film was released on October 21, 2016, in IMAX and conventional formats. It grossed $162 million worldwide and received mixed reviews from critics, who praised Cruise's performance and the film's action sequences, but criticized the plot.

Plot
After helping the 110th US Army CID Military Police arrest corrupt Oklahoma Sheriff Raymond Wood, local deputy and bust a human trafficking ring, drifter and ex-US Army Military Police investigator and  major, Jack Reacher, returns to his old military headquarters in Washington, DC, to meet Major Susan Turner, with whom he has been working by phone during his travels. He learns from Colonel Sam Morgan that Turner has been accused of espionage and arrested.

Some evidence shows that Turner is involved in the murders of two US Army Military Police soldiers in Afghanistan, but Reacher believes she is being framed. He also learns that an old acquaintance of his, Candice Dutton, has filed a paternity suit against him, claiming he is the biological father of her 15-year-old daughter, Samantha. Reacher tries to reach out to Samantha, but she rebuffs him.

Turner's lawyer, Colonel Moorcroft, is later killed by the Hunter, an ex-SOCOM operator-turned mercenary who frames Reacher for the murder. Reacher is arrested and transported to the prison where Turner is being detained. When two hitmen arrive, Reacher neutralizes them, then escapes with Turner. They go to Morgan's house, having deduced he is involved in the conspiracy. The Hunter later kills Morgan and again frames Reacher.

Reacher and Turner uncover surveillance pictures of Samantha and surmise she is in danger. Arriving at her home, they find her foster parents killed and Samantha hiding. The three travel to Turner's old private school for protection, but discover that Samantha has her mobile phone with her, which the enemy has likely tracked. They make a quick exit, during which Samantha steals credit cards from one of the students.

The trio goes to New Orleans in search of Daniel Prudhomme, the only eyewitness to the murders for which Turner has been framed. En route, Samantha reveals that she is the one who filed the paternity suit in order to gain financial support from Reacher for her mother. Reacher and Turner find Prudhomme in a derelict warehouse filled with drug addicts. Prudhomme turns out to be connected to Parasource, a private military organization that is trying to cover up the murders. Reacher contacts Turner's friend, Captain Anthony Espin, to move Prudhomme into custody, but they are ambushed by Parasource operatives and Prudhomme is killed, while Reacher rescues a wounded Espin. Parasource's CEO, General James Harkness, sends the Hunter to capture Samantha.

Reacher, Turner, Espin and a team of Military Police officers, acting on information from Prudhomme, intercept a shipment of weapons due to enter the country, where they confront Harkness and his men. Espin finds antitank weapons, as declared in the flight manifest. They also learn that Harkness framed Turner, who had been investigating his activities, for the murders of the two soldiers who had discovered that Harkness was selling weapons to insurgents and smuggling opium into the United States.

The Hunter and his men chase Samantha through the streets of New Orleans to lure Reacher into a confrontation. While Reacher and Turner kill his henchmen, The Hunter captures Samantha on a rooftop. However, when Reacher arrives, she manages to escape. Reacher tackles the Hunter and they have a vicious fight, ending with Reacher breaking the Hunter's arm, leg, and neck, before dumping his body off the rooftop.

Following Harkness' arrest, Turner is reinstated to her command. Reacher promises to keep in touch, then goes to meet Samantha at a diner. He tells Samantha he will recognize her mother, if he knows her, as he remembers every woman he has slept with. Samantha reveals that the waitress that had been serving him is, in fact, her mother, and that Reacher cannot be her father, as neither had recognized the other. Reacher and Samantha then reluctantly part.

As Reacher is walking along a road, he is surprised when a phone Samantha had slipped into his pocket rings. He finds a text message from her reading, "Miss me yet?". Reacher smiles as he sticks out his thumb to hitch a ride.

Cast

In addition, Lee Child, author of the Jack Reacher novel series, makes a brief appearance as a TSA agent.

Production
While Jack Reacher was intended to be a tent-pole for a film series,  a sequel was initially reported to be unlikely due to its lackluster run at the North American box office. In February 2013, a sequel became more likely after the film surpassed a gross of $200 million worldwide. On December 9, 2013,  Paramount Pictures and Skydance Media announced they were moving forward with the development of a second film, reportedly based on the 2013 Jack Reacher novel Never Go Back.  On May 14, 2014, Tom Cruise was reported to be reprising his role as Jack Reacher.

On May 19, 2015, Deadline reported that Edward Zwick would reteam with Cruise, and direct the film. Zwick wrote the script along with Marshall Herskovitz and Richard Wenk. Zwick and Cruise had previously worked together on The Last Samurai. On August 14, 2015, Cobie Smulders was added to the cast to play the female lead. On September 15, Danika Yarosh signed on to star in the film, on September 17, Aldis Hodge was added to the cast, and on September 22, Patrick Heusinger was cast in the villain role. On October 20, Holt McCallany joined the film, as did Austin Hebert. On November 12, 2015, Robert Catrini joined, and on January 20, 2016, Robert Knepper was cast as General Harkness, a retired general, and CEO of a private military firm.

Principal photography on the film began on October 20, 2015, in New Orleans, Louisiana. On November 23, 2015, filming took place in Baton Rouge, and in January 2016, filming also took place in St. Francisville. Filming wrapped on January 30, 2016.

Release

Theatrical release
On June 14, 2016, Entertainment Weekly premiered a preview of the first trailer, with Cobie Smulders introducing the footage. The official Jack Reacher Twitter account announced that a full trailer would be released on June 22, 2016.  A browser game, titled Jack Reacher: Never Stop Punching, was also released to promote the film.

In September 2015, Paramount set Jack Reacher: Never Go Back a release date of October 21, 2016.

Home media
Jack Reacher: Never Go Back was released on digital HD on January 17, 2017, and on  Blu-ray, Ultra HD Blu-ray, and DVD on January 31, 2017.

By May 2018, the film had made $14.5 million in domestic region video sales.

Reception

Box office
Jack Reacher: Never Go Back grossed $58.7 million in the United States and Canada, and $103.4 million in other countries, for a worldwide total of $162.1 million, against a production budget of $96 million.

In the United States and Canada, the film opened alongside Ouija: Origin of Evil, Keeping Up with the Joneses, Boo! A Madea Halloween, and I'm Not Ashamed, and was projected to gross around $20 million from 3,780 theaters in its opening weekend, with the studio expecting a debut of about $17 million. It earned $1.3 million in midnight showings at 1,850 theaters, slightly above Oblivions $1.1 million and under Edge of Tomorrows $1.8 million. For the weekend, the film opened to $23 million, finishing in second place, behind Boo! A Madea Halloween. In its second weekend, the film dropped by 58.2%, grossing $9.6 million, and finishing third at the box office, behind A Madea Halloween ($16.7 million) and newcomer Inferno ($15 million).

Outside North America, the film was released in 42 countries in conjunction with its United States and Canada debut, representing about 75% of the film's total marketplace internationally. In 30 of those markets, the film posted a bigger opening than the first Reacher film, and posted the top movie openings of the week in the United Kingdom and Ireland ($3.3 million), France ($2.8 million), Australia ($2 million), Russia ($2 million), Indonesia ($1.9 million), Taiwan ($1.6 million), and the United Arab Emirates ($1.3 million).

Critical response
On Rotten Tomatoes, the film has an approval rating of 37%, based on 234 reviews, with an average rating of 5.2/10. The website's critical consensus reads, "Monotonously formulaic, Jack Reacher: Never Go Back is one action-thriller sequel whose title also serves as a warning." On Metacritic, the film has a weighted average score 47 out of 100, based on 43 critics, indicating "mixed or average reviews". Audiences polled by CinemaScore gave the film an average grade of "B+" on an A+ to F scale, while the first film received an "A−".

Peter Travers of Rolling Stone wrote: "The star gives author Lee Childs’ action-lit ex-military hero an agility, rage, and quick wit in this satisfying sequel". Travers notes that Cruise is very different from the character in the books and that critics need to get over it, and says, "Cruise finds the core of Reacher in his eyes, with a haunted gaze that says this lone wolf is still on a mission and still a long way from home. That's the Reacher Lee Child created in his books. And Cruise does him proud."

Todd McCarthy of The Hollywood Reporter called it "a notable drop-off from the first Reacher feature" and said "by-the-numbers plotting, seen-it-all-before action moves, banal locations, and a largely anonymous cast alongside the star give this a low-rent feel."
Peter Debruge of Variety wrote: "Zwick barely manages to tickle our adrenaline, waiting till the climactic showdown amid a New Orleans Halloween parade to deliver a sequence that could legitimately register as memorable."

Future

Following the mixed critical reception to Never Go Back, plans for a third installment were delayed, while a reboot in the form of an Amazon Prime exclusive television series was announced. In July 2020, Christopher McQuarrie stated that Cruise and he had been working on developments for additional movies featuring the titular character. Plans for the third film included darker themes, with intentions for the future movies in the series to be R-rated. The filmmaker further acknowledged the possibility for a return to the series at a later date, stating that the "franchise has moved on...we haven't."

On February 4, 2022, an 8 episode series of Reacher was released on Amazon Prime, starring Alan Ritchson in the lead role. The series adapts Child's first novel, Killing Floor.

References

External links
 

2016 films
2016 action thriller films
2016 crime thriller films
American action thriller films
American crime thriller films
American detective films
American sequel films
IMAX films
Films scored by Henry Jackman
American films about Halloween
Films based on British novels
Films based on thriller novels
Films directed by Edward Zwick
Films produced by Tom Cruise
Films about the United States Army
Films set in 2016
Films shot in New Orleans
Films shot in Louisiana
Films set in Washington, D.C.
Films with screenplays by Richard Wenk
Paramount Pictures films
Skydance Media films
Jack Reacher
2010s English-language films
2010s American films